Richard Miller (December 25, 1928 – January 30, 2019) was an American character actor who appeared in more than 180 films, including many produced by Roger Corman. He later appeared in the films of directors who began their careers with Corman, including Joe Dante, James Cameron, and Martin Scorsese, with the distinction of appearing in every film directed by Dante. He was known for playing the beleaguered everyman, often in one-scene appearances. 

Miller's main roles in films included Gremlins, Gremlins 2: The New Batch, Explorers, Piranha, The Howling, A Bucket of Blood, The Little Shop of Horrors, Not of This Earth, Chopping Mall, Night of the Creeps, The Terminator, The 'Burbs, Small Soldiers and Quake.

Early life
Miller was born on Christmas Day, 1928, in The Bronx, New York, the son of Russian Jewish immigrants, Rita (Blucher), an opera singer, and Ira Miller, a printer. He served a tour of duty in the United States Navy. Miller attended the City College of New York, Columbia University, and New York University, eventually attaining a PhD in psychology. He was a writer before turning to acting.

Career
While working as a graduate psychologist, Miller performed on Broadway and also worked at the Bellevue Hospital Mental Hygiene Clinic and the psychiatric department of Queens General Hospital. In 1952, he moved to California seeking work as a writer. One of his earliest acting roles was in Apache Woman (1955). He played one of the townspeople and also a separate role as an Indian. In an action scene his townsperson character shoots his Indian character, as related in the documentary Corman's World.

His movie roles include White Line Fever, The Terminator, All The Right Moves, Night of the Creeps, Small Soldiers, It Conquered the World, A Bucket of Blood, The Little Shop of Horrors, the Tales from the Crypt movie Demon Knight, Amazon Women on the Moon, Chopping Mall, The Howling, Piranha and I Wanna Hold Your Hand. His best known role was in the movies Gremlins and Gremlins 2: The New Batch as Murray Futterman. He appeared in Pulp Fiction as Monster Joe, but his scene and a few others were deleted because of the film's length. He also appeared in Rod Stewart's video for the song "Infatuation" in 1984, with Mike Mazurki and Kay Lenz.

His television credits include as a Townsman on the 1963 TV Western Gunsmoke (S9E8's "Carter Caper"), in Combat!, as a young soldier in the 5th-season episode "The Outsider"; Police Squad! (a 1980s crime spoof series with Leslie Nielsen); V: The Final Battle as Dan Pascal; three seasons as the generous bartender Lou Mackie on Fame; Star Trek: The Next Generation, in the season 1 episode "The Big Goodbye", as the newspaper stand man in the holodeck; Star Trek: Deep Space Nine, in the season 3 two-part episode "Past Tense", as Vin; Time of Your Life; as a prison guard in Soap (1979); and as the voice of the gangster Chuckie Sol in the animated feature film Batman: Mask of the Phantasm. He also directed television shows, including "The Fix", a 1986 episode of the series Miami Vice.

In 2000, Miller was featured alongside former collaborators including Roger Corman, Sam Arkoff and Peter Bogdanovich in the documentary SCHLOCK! The Secret History of American Movies, a film about the rise and fall of American exploitation cinema. In 2014 he appeared in a documentary of his life, That Guy Dick Miller. He is also credited for appearing in a Sega CD video game, Prize Fighter, as corner man for the main character.

Walter Paisley

Miller portrayed several fictional characters named Walter Paisley. As he noted, "I've played Walter Paisley five times now, I think." By 2011, the character name had actually appeared seven times on film and once in a theatrical production, with Miller providing six of these portrayals. The name first appeared in the Roger Corman film A Bucket of Blood. In that film, Paisley is a busboy who becomes an artist of sorts by killing his subjects and covering them in clay. In 1976, Miller again played a character named Walter Paisley—this time a talent agent—in another Corman production, Hollywood Boulevard, directed by Allan Arkush and Joe Dante.

Dante cast Miller as another character named Walter Paisley in the 1981 film The Howling. This time, Paisley is the owner of an occult bookshop. Two years later, the name appeared again for another Miller character, the owner of a diner in the third segment of Twilight Zone: The Movie. 1986's Chopping Mall featured a janitor named Walter Paisley, and the 1994 made-for-TV remake of Shake, Rattle and Rock! had Miller playing a character named Officer Paisley. Officer Paisley also appeared in Night of the Creeps. Miller played a variation on the role one last time in his final posthumously released film Hanukkah. Two other actors have portrayed the A Bucket of Blood character: Anthony Michael Hall in the 1995 television remake; and James Stanton in a musical produced by Chicago's Annoyance Theatre.

Personal life
Miller married Lainie (Sheila Elaine Halpern) on October 6, 1967, and they had one child together, Barbara. Miller died at age 90 of a heart attack on January 30, 2019 while being treated for pneumonia in Toluca Lake, Los Angeles.

Filmography

References

External links

 Biography on (re)Search my Trash
 
 

1928 births
2019 deaths
American male film actors
American male television actors
American male voice actors
American people of Russian-Jewish descent
American Ashkenazi Jews
City College of New York alumni
Columbia University alumni
Jewish American male actors
Male actors from New York City
Military personnel from New York City
New York University alumni
People from the Bronx
United States Navy sailors
21st-century American Jews